Eugene Arthur TeSelle (August 8, 1931 – March 1, 2018) was an American academic, church historian, and community activist. He was born in Ames, IA, the son of Eugene Arthur TeSelle, a dairy plant supervisor and technician (and for a short period, the owner of TeSelle Dairy), and Hildegarde Flynn TeSelle.  The family lived in Nebraska and Ohio, then in Colorado Springs, Salida, and Greeley, CO.  He had one sister, Ellen TeSelle Boal.

TeSelle earned his B.A. from the University of Colorado at Boulder in 1952, finishing in 3 years.  He then went on to Princeton Theological Seminar to earn a B.D. (Bachelor of Divinity) in 1955 and to Yale University Divinity School, where he earned an M.A. in 1960 and a Ph.D. in 1963.

He taught at Yale Department of Religious Studies (prior to 1969) before joining Vanderbilt Divinity School, in which he became Oberlin Professor of Church History and Theology. In November 2018, an overpass of Interstate 440 was named after TeSelle, who had campaigned against the highway.

TeSelle married Sallie McFague in 1959. They had two children, Elizabeth (born 1962) and John (born 1964). They were divorced in 1976.  In 1978, TeSelle married Penny Saunders Peatman, to whom he was married until his death.

Works

References

1931 births
2018 deaths
Yale University faculty
Vanderbilt University faculty
Augustine scholars